Teldeniya Town is a village in Sri Lanka. It is located within the Central Province and about 20 kilometers from Kandy town. Teldeniya town was originally located at a slightly different location from today's location. It was submerged in water when building the Victoria Dam and the remains of the old town still emerges in drought seasons.

External links

Populated places in Kandy District